Mongolia competed at the 1972 Summer Olympics in Munich, West Germany. 39 competitors, 37 men and 2 women, took part in 39 events in 7 sports.

Medalists

Silver
 Khorloogiin Bayanmönkh — Wrestling, freestyle heavyweight (90–100 kg)

Archery

In the first modern archery competition at the Olympics, Mongolia entered one man and two women. Their highest placing competitor was Natjav Dariimaa, at 14th place in the women's competition.

Women's Individual Competition
 Natjav Dariimaa — 2341 points (→ 14th place)
 Doljin Demberel — 2152 points (→ 36th place)

Women's Individual Competition
 Galsan Biambaa — 2253 points (→ 43rd place)

Athletics

Men's 100 metres
Enkhbaatar Bjambajav
 First Heat — 10.93s (→ did not advance)

Boxing

Men's Light Flyweight (– 48 kg)
 Vandui Batbayar
 First Round — Lost to Héctor Velasquez (CHL), 0:5

Men's Light Middleweight (– 71 kg)
Namchal Tsendaiush
 First Round — Bye 
 Second Round — Lost to Jae Keun-Lim (KOR), 2:3

Judo

Shooting

Four male shooters represented Mongolia in 1972.

25 m pistol
 Tüdeviin Myagmarjav

50 m pistol
 Tserenjavyn Ölziibayar
 Tüdeviin Myagmarjav

300 m rifle, three positions
 Yondonjamtsyn Batsükh

50 m rifle, three positions
 Mendbayaryn Jantsankhorloo
 Yondonjamtsyn Batsükh

50 m rifle, prone
 Mendbayaryn Jantsankhorloo
 Yondonjamtsyn Batsükh

Weightlifting

Wrestling

References

External links
Official Olympic Reports
International Olympic Committee results database

Nations at the 1972 Summer Olympics
1972 Summer Olympics
Oly